Der Templer und die Jüdin  (English: The Templar and the Jewess) is an opera (designated as a Große romantische Oper) in three acts by Heinrich Marschner. The German libretto by Wilhelm August Wohlbrück was based on a number of intermediate works based in turn on Walter Scott's 1819 novel Ivanhoe.

Performance history

The first performance took place at the Leipzig Opera on 22 December 1829. It became Marschner's most successful work and was staged more than 200 times in Germany during the next 70 years.

A revised version with recitatives rather than spoken dialogue was performed in Berlin on 3 August 1831 with Eduard Devrient as Bois-Guilbert. It was given in London at the Prince's Theatre on 17 June 1840, and in New York on 29 January 1872.

Many critics regarded the opera as unnecessarily complicated (and expensive to produce) and simplified versions were prepared by Felix Mottl, Richard Kleinmichel and finally Hans Pfitzner (1912). The latter's version was performed in Lübeck, Strasbourg and Cologne just before the First World War.

The opera was revived at the Wexford Festival in 1989, conducted by Albert Rosen and directed by Francesca Zambello, with William Stone as Bois-Guilbert and Greer Grimsley as the Black Knight.

Robert Schumann quotes an air from this opera in the finale of his Études symphoniques for piano.

Roles

Synopsis
The opera is set in England at the end of the 12th century and the main characters include The Black Knight, King Richard 'the Lionheart', Saxons, Normans, Templars and Robin Hood (here called Lokslei, i.e., Locksley) and his band of outlaws.

References
Sources

Palmer, A Dean (1992), 'Templer und die Jüdin, Der' in The New Grove Dictionary of Opera, ed. Stanley Sadie (London)

External links
 Synopsis by Charles Annesley in The Standard Operaglass 13th ed, 1896
 Synopsis by A Dean Palmer
 German libretto (Stanford)

Operas by Heinrich Marschner
Operas
Romantische Opern
German-language operas
1829 operas
Operas based on novels
Operas based on works by Walter Scott
Operas set in England
Works based on Ivanhoe